Orrell may refer to:

Orrell, Greater Manchester, a district of the Metropolitan Borough of Wigan
Orrell (ward), an electoral ward of the Wigan Metropolitan Borough Council
Orrell, Merseyside, an urban area east of Bootle, in the Metropolitan Borough of Sefton
Orrell Urban District, Lancashire
Orrell R.U.F.C., a rugby union team from Wigan
Orrell (surname)